Cixi, alternately romanized as Tzeki, is a county-level city under the jurisdiction of the sub-provincial city of Ningbo, in the north of Zhejiang province, China. As of the 2020 census, its population was 1,829,488. Its urban agglomeration built-up (or metro) area, largely contiguous with Cixi plus the county-level city of Yuyao, had 3,083,520 inhabitants.

History 
Cixi is a city with a rich culture and a long history. It was part of the state of Yue in the Spring and Autumn period (770-476 B.C.). The county was set up in the Qin Dynasty. At first it was called “Gouzhang” and has been using the name of “Cixi” since the Kaiyuan reign of the Tang Dynasty (738 A.D.).

Geography 

Administrative divisions
Subdistricts:
Baisha Road Subdistrict (白沙路街道), Gutang Subdistrict (古塘街道), Hushan Subdistrict (浒山街道), Kandun Subdistrict (坎墩街道), Zonghan Subdistrict (宗汉街道)

Towns:
Andong (庵东镇), Changhe (长河镇), Chongshou (崇寿镇), Fuhai (附海镇), Guanhaiwei (观海卫镇), Henghe (横河镇), Kuangyan (匡堰镇), Longshan (龙山镇), Qiaotou (桥头镇), Shengshan (胜山镇), Tianyuan (天元镇), Xiaolin (逍林镇), Xinpu (新浦镇), Zhangqi (掌起镇), Zhouxiang (周巷镇)

Climate
Cixi has a subtropical monsoon climate, with an average annual temperature of 17℃.

Transportation
Cixi has an effective public transportation system.
Highway connections are provided to all major cities, typical travel times are 1.5 hours or less by car, including access to the four major airports, Ningbo Lishe International Airport, Hangzhou Xiaoshan International Airport, Shanghai Hongqiao Airport, and Shanghai Pudong International Airport. Shanghai and Ningbo are also the closest sea ports.

Economy 
Cixi is an important manufacturing city in northern Zhejiang province. The Hangzhou Bay New District is located in the city.

Population 
Fifteen towns and five subdistricts are under the jurisdiction of Cixi City and there are 325 administrative villages including committees and communities.

Culture 
The city houses many Yue Kiln Sites, which are widely regarded as one of the origin of Chinese porcelain.

Cixi has the tradition of advocating culture and emphasizing education, with several thousand years of historical relics and profound cultural background which cultivated three regional cultures, i.e. “celadon, reclamation and immigration”. Shanglin Lake celadon has been sold overseas as a “Maritime Silk Road” to the world, historical tideland reclamation area has become one of the areas with the most abundant land reserve resources in Zhejiang Province, and the immigration culture has several years of history.

Cixi was listed as the "demonstration base for community digital learning in the national city and countryside" by the Ministry of Education in 2010 and 2011.

Notable people 
 Han Qide, medical scientist and Former President of the China Association for Science and Technology
 Han Zheng, member of Standing Committee of the CPC Central Committee Political Bureau
 Ing Chang-ki, Taiwan industrial magnate
 Lu Yongxiang, Academician and Former President of the Chinese Academy of Sciences
 Lu Zhangong, member of CPC 19th Central Committee
 Tan Jiazhen, founder of modern Chinese genetics
 Yang Xianjiang, educator
 Zhou Xinfang, Master of Beijing Opera
 Zhu Zuxiang, agricultural scientist

See also
List of twin towns and sister cities in China

References

External links 

The People's Government Cixi City official website

Geography of Ningbo
County-level cities in Zhejiang